Mather Point is a -cliff-elevation Point located in the central Grand Canyon, Coconino County of northern Arizona, United States. It was named in honor of Stephen Tyng Mather, an American industrialist and conservationist.

It is located about 2.0 miles east-northeast of Grand Canyon Village on the South Rim. It is about 0.75 miles east of Yavapai Point, its closest scenic viewpoint neighbor, and it lies about 1.5 miles west of Yaki Point, across Upper Pipe Creek Canyon. Pipe Creek enters Lower Garden Creek, and the Bright Angel Trail descends there to cross the Colorado River and go up Bright Angel Canyon. The viewpoints of Mather Point, (and Yavapai Point), look northwards (across Granite Gorge), up Bright Angel Canyon, and view the prominences that align it, especially the nearest of Isis Temple and Cheops Pyramid, and on the east, Zoroaster Temple, with Demaray Point, Bradley Point, and Sumner Butte.

Mather Point is about 1.0 mi north of Arizona Rt 64, South Rim Drive, the access road along the South Rim. The Rim Trail of the South Rim traverses through the major points of the South Rim, including Mather Point.

Mather Point is composed of horizontally-layered cliff-former Kaibab Limestone, and is mostly buff, or tan-white. The rock at the point is distinctive with its limestone erosion-holes, and is broken into large blocks. Mather Point is also composed of Kaibab upon Toroweap Formation slopes, upon white cliffs of Coconino Sandstone.

References

External links

Aerial view: Mather Point, Mountainzone
Mather Point, (text & photos), Americansouthwest.net

Grand Canyon
Grand Canyon National Park
Grand Canyon, South Rim
Scenic viewpoints in Grand Canyon National Park